The 1967–68 Boston Bruins season was the Bruins' 44th season in the NHL.

Offseason
In 1967, the Black Hawks made a trade with the Boston Bruins that turned out to be one of the most one-sided in the history of the sport. Chicago sent young forwards Phil Esposito, Ken Hodge and Fred Stanfield to Boston in exchange for Pit Martin, Jack Norris and Gilles Marotte.

Regular season

Season standings

Record vs. opponents

Schedule and results

Player statistics

Regular season
Scoring

Goaltending

Playoffs
Scoring

Goaltending

Awards and honors

Draft picks
Boston's picks at the 1967 NHL Entry Draft.

References
 Bruins on Hockey Database

Boston Bruins seasons
Boston Bruins
Boston Bruins
Boston Bruins
Boston Bruins
1960s in Boston